Juan Fernando Caicedo Benítez (born 13 July 1989) is a Colombian professional footballer that currently plays for Categoría Primera A club Deportes Tolima.

Career
Caicedo began his career with Cortuluá in 2010, scoring 1 goal in 8 appearances. He then transferred to Deportes Quindio in 2011, staying with them for two seasons. Caicedo had a great season in 2012, scoring 13 league goals, including a hat trick against Deportes Tolima. However, he missed two trainings without explanation, which made it seem like he was going to leave, and in January 2013, Caicedo signed with Danubio F.C. of Uruguay. Despite the transfer, he only played a few preseason matches before being released from the club because of problems with Deportes Quindio.

In February 2013, Caicedo signed a 1.5 year deal with CA Independiente of Argentina. His first two goals for the club came in a 3-1 victory against San Martín de San Juan. He was loaned out to Independiente Santa Fe after scoring 2 goals in 14 games. He joined Atletico Huila in 2014 and had a great season, being second in the top scorers list behind Germán Cano with 14 goals. Caicedo's performances interested Independiente Medellín, and they signed him the next year, in 2015.

In his first season with the club, he was one of the top scorers, and was part of the squad that finished runner-up that season. In the next season, he won his first title with the club, the 2016 season.

He signed on loan with New England Revolution of Major League Soccer in December 2018. The deal included a purchase option for New England at the end of the 2019 MLS season, which they decided not to take because of Caicedo's desire to return to Colombia and his subpar performances. On 27 April 2019, he scored two goals against Sporting Kansas City in a 4-4 draw.

Caicedo rejoined Independiente after his loan expired, but signed with Deportes Tolima midway through the 2020 season. He scored on his debut on 14 September against Deportivo Pasto in a 3–1 win. Caicedo scored in the opening match of the 2021 season on 18 January, as well as scoring in the semifinal in the Copa Colombia on 28 January against Pasto. Caicedo was unavailable as Tolima lost in the final against Caicedo's old club, Independiente. After missing the months of March and April with injury, Caicedo returned on 12 May in the Copa Sudamericana, with the league season paused in the quarterfinals of the knockout stage. Caicedo returned to the starting line-up for the knockout stage and scored all three goals for Tolima in the two-legged final against Millonarios, as they won their third title, 3–2 on aggregate.

Honors

Independiente Medellín 

 Categoría Primera A: 2016 Apertura

Deportes Tolima 

 Categoria Primera A: 2021 Apertura

Career statistics

References

External links
 
 

1989 births
Living people
Colombian footballers
Colombian expatriate footballers
Cortuluá footballers
Centauros Villavicencio footballers
Deportes Quindío footballers
Club Atlético Independiente footballers
Independiente Santa Fe footballers
Atlético Huila footballers
Independiente Medellín footballers
New England Revolution players
Deportes Tolima footballers
Argentine Primera División players
Categoría Primera A players
Major League Soccer players
Association football forwards
Colombian expatriate sportspeople in Argentina
Colombian expatriate sportspeople in the United States
Expatriate footballers in Argentina
Expatriate soccer players in the United States
Sportspeople from Antioquia Department